Sahar Helal (April 15, 1969 – May 2, 2004) was a synchronized swimmer from Egypt. She competed in the women's solo event in synchronized swimming competition at the 1984 Summer Olympics. She was the youngest participant in synchronized swimming event aged 15 years, 116 days then.

Olympic participation

Los Angeles 1984
Synchronized Swimming – Women's Solo

References 

1969 births
2004 deaths
Egyptian synchronized swimmers
Olympic synchronized swimmers of Egypt
Synchronized swimmers at the 1984 Summer Olympics
20th-century Egyptian people